Guadalajara is the capital of the state of Jalisco, Mexico.

Guadalajara may also refer to:

Places

Mexico
Guadalajara (international airport)
Guadalajara metropolitan area, a metropolitan area in the state of Jalisco
University of Guadalajara, a public university in Guadalajara, Jalisco
C.D. Guadalajara, a Mexican association football club

Spain
Province of Guadalajara, a province in Castile-La Mancha
Guadalajara, Spain, the capital of the province
Guadalajara (Congress of Deputies constituency)
Guadalajara (Senate constituency)
Guadalajara (Cortes of Castilla–La Mancha constituency)
Guadalajara (RENFE station), a railway station in Guadalajara
Battle of Guadalajara, a 1937 Spanish Civil War battle
CD Guadalajara (Spain), a Spanish association football club

Entertainment
Guadalajara (film), a 1943 Mexican film directed by Chano Urueta
"Guadalajara" (song), a 1937 song written and composed by Pepe Guízar

See also